Nigel Atherton is the editor of Amateur Photographer magazine, the world's oldest weekly consumer photography magazine, published in the UK since October 1884.

He studied photography at Plymouth College of Art & Design  and the University of Westminster.

References

English magazine editors
Alumni of the University of Westminster